Mohammed Bagayogo Es Sudane Al Wangari Al Timbukti  was an eminent scholar from Timbuktu, Mali. He was the Sheik and professor of highly esteemed scholar, Ahmed Baba and teacher at the Sankore Madrasah, one of three philosophical schools in Mali during West Africa's golden age (i.e. 12th-16th centuries); the other two were Sidi Yahya Mosque and Djinguereber Mosque. He was born in Djenné in 1523. A significant amount of his writing has been preserved in manuscript form at the Ahmed Baba Institute, a repository for African literature. Some of the manuscripts found their way into French museums. A project is under way to digitalise these manuscripts which will lead to better understanding of the culture that flourished in Mali in the medieval period.

Mohammed Bagayogo also has a place in Mali history for his refusal to comply with Moroccan occupiers.
He died on July 7, 1593 in what is now old town of Timbuktu.

References

 bin Yahya al-Wangari, Mukhtar. "Shaykh Baghayogho al-Wangari and the Wangari Library in Timbuktu." in Jeppie, Shamil, and Souleymane Bachir Diagne (eds.)The meanings of Timbuktu. University of Cape Town Press, 2010. pp.277-285 https://publication.codesria.org/index.php/pub/catalog/download/141/1238/4156?inline=1

 Adama, Hamadou. "Ahmed Bâba at-Timbuktî." In Oxford Research Encyclopedia of African History. 2021.

 Hunwick, John. "Timbuktu: A Refuge of Scholarly and Righteous Folk." Sudanic Africa14 (2003): 13-20.

 Hunwick, John. "Towards a History of the Islamic Intellectual Tradition in West Africa down to the Nineteenth Century." Journal for Islamic Studies 17 (1997): 4.

 Singleton, Brent D. "African bibliophiles: Books and libraries in medieval Timbuktu." Libraries & Culture 39, no. 1 (2004): 1-12.
 W. Massing, Andreas. "Baghayogho: A soninke Muslim diaspora in the mande world." Cahiers d’études africaines 176, no. 4 (2004): 887-922.

1523 births
1593 deaths
People from Mopti Region
People from Timbuktu
Malian philosophers
Malian scholars
16th-century African people